Thingbu is a settlement in Tawang district in the north-eastern state of Arunachal Pradesh, India.

Location 

It is located on the  proposed Mago-Thingbu to Vijaynagar Arunachal Pradesh Frontier Highway along the McMahon Line,  alignment map of which can be seen here and here.

Demographics

A small village occupied by Monpa tribe & consists of 58 households.

Culture

Main festivals: Losar, Gandan Ngamchod etc.

Religion: Buddhist.

Dress: Traditional Shinka, Totung, Tenga-kime, Khichin, etc. ( for women). Khanjar, Chhuba, Totung, etc. (for men)

Climate

Heavy snowfall occurs during the months of December, January & February.

See also

 North-East Frontier Agency
 List of people from Arunachal Pradesh
 Religion in Arunachal Pradesh
 Cuisine of Arunachal Pradesh
 List of institutions of higher education in Arunachal Pradesh

References 

Villages in Tawang district